The Mermaid of Zennor is a popular Cornish folk tale that was first recorded by the Cornish folklorist William Bottrell in 1873.  The legend has inspired works of poetry, literature and art.

Synopsis
Long ago, a beautiful and richly dressed woman occasionally attended services at St. Senara's Church in Zennor, and sometimes at Morvah.  The parishioners were enchanted by her beauty and her voice, for her singing was sweeter than all the rest.  She appeared infrequently for scores of years, but never seemed to age, and nobody knew whence she came, although they watched her from the summit of Tregarthen Hill.  After many years, the mysterious woman became interested in a young man named Mathey Trewella, "the best singer in the parish."  One day he followed her home, and disappeared; neither was ever seen again in Zennor Church.

The villagers wondered what had become of the two, until one Sunday a ship cast anchor about a mile from Pendour Cove.  Soon after, a mermaid appeared, and asked that the anchor be raised, as one of its flukes was resting on her door, and she was unable to reach her children.  The sailors obliged, and quickly set sail, believing the mermaid to be an ill omen.  But when the villagers heard of this, they concluded that the mermaid was the same lady who had long visited their church, and that she had enticed Mathey Trewella to come and live with her.

The parishioners at St. Senara's commemorated the story by having one end of a bench carved in the shape of a mermaid.  A shorter account of the legend was related to Bottrell on a subsequent visit to Cornwall.  The mermaid had come to church every Sunday to hear the choir sing, and her own voice was so sweet that she enticed Mathey Trewella, son of the churchwarden, to come away with her; neither was seen again on dry land.  The famed "mermaid chair" was the same bench on which the mermaid had sat and sung, opposite Trewella in the singing loft.

Today

The "mermaid chair" at St. Senara's Church can be seen to this day, and together with the accompanying legend, is one of the popular attractions mentioned in tourist guides to Cornwall. The story of the mermaid is retold in later collections of Cornish folklore, generally following the original accounts collected by Bottrell. In The Fabled Coast, the "mermaid chair" is described as a fifteenth-century carving.  Kingshill and Westwood suppose that the bench itself inspired the legend, rather than the other way around, as the villagers related. There are many reasons as to why there might have been a mermaid carved into a chair at a church, as mermaids represented two things to medieval Christians. They were thought to be a symbol of lust, due to their connection with the Greek goddess Aphrodite, and they were also thought to be an illustration of Jesus Christ, because of their fish-human form, for, just as mermaids are both human-like and fish-like, Jesus can be both human and divine.

Adaptations
"The Ballad of the Mermaid of Zennor", is a poem by Vernon Watkins.

"The Mermaid of Zennor", 1922.

"The Mermaid of Zennor", is a poem by John Heath-Stubbs, who lived in Zennor for a while in the 1950s.

The legend is the subject of the 1980 song "Mermaid" by Cornish folk singer Brenda Wootton.

Craig Weatherhill wrote the Mermaid of Zennor into his novel Seat of Storms (Tabb House, 1997), giving her the name Azenor, as the previous tellings never name her.

The Mermaid of Zennor is a poem by Charles Causley, published (with further content about the legend) in a book of the same or a similar title -- some early editions are called 'The Merrymaid of Zennor'. It is illustrated by Michael Foreman; 

Eileen Moloney published a book of the same title, illustrated by Maise Meiklejohn in 1946.

The legend is linked to St. Senara in Sue Monk Kidd's, The Mermaid Chair, which was adapted into a movie in 2006.

British writer Helen Dunmore was inspired in part by the Mermaid of Zennor when writing her Ingo Chronicles. The first book of the series, Ingo, published in 2005, begins with the story of the mermaid and the main story line is loosely based around the legend.

British Folk singer Seth Lakeman wrote a song called "Closing Hymn" about the Mermaid of Zennor.

2011 saw the premiere of composer Leo Geyer and poet Martin Kratz's modern retelling of the legend in a chamber opera, which was described by The Times as "imaginative and beautifully shaped" in its second production by Constella OperaBallet at the Tête à Tête Opera Festival 2012.  

In 2012 the legend was adapted by Paul Drayton for an opera commissioned by the Cornish company Duchy Opera.

In 2014 indie band The Hit Parade released their album Cornish Pop Songs featuring the song "Zennor Mermaid."  In a curious twist, the local arts writer who interviewed Hit Parade founder Julian Henry for The Cornishman was named "Lee Trewhela."

In 2014 singer/songwriter Martha Tilston released her album The Sea featuring the song "Mermaid of Zennor".

2015 saw the premier of "The Mermaid of Zennor" by Philip Harper, a work for brass band. Commissioned for the Cornwall Youth Brass Band, it was chosen for the National Brass Band Championship regionals in the same year (second section).

2020 - Cornish Folk singer Hazel Simmons releases song "The Mermaid of Zennor" based on the legend.

In 2021 English singer-songwriter Paul William Gibson released "The Mermaid of Zennor", an adaptation of the legend told from the perspective of Mathey Trewella.

In the movie Miranda (1948 film) the main character, Miranda Trewella, says that she is the great-granddaughter of the Mermaid of Zennor.

Notes

References

Cornish culture
Cornish folklore
Mermaids